Gocha Khojava (born 16 March 1985) is a Georgian former football player. He also holds Russian citizenship as Gocha Dzhemalovich Khodzhava.

References

External links
 Profile at Championat.ru 
 Russian First Division Squads 2008
 

1985 births
Living people
Footballers from Georgia (country)
Georgia (country) under-21 international footballers
Expatriate footballers from Georgia (country)
FC Anzhi Makhachkala players
Anorthosis Famagusta F.C. players
FC Rostov players
Association football midfielders
Expatriate footballers in Cyprus
Expatriate footballers in Russia
Russian Premier League players
FC Volga Nizhny Novgorod players
FC SKA-Khabarovsk players
FC Spartak Vladikavkaz players
FC Sakhalin Yuzhno-Sakhalinsk players
Georgia (country) international footballers
Georgia (country) youth international footballers